Jir Duzan (also Romanized as Jīr Dūzān and Jīrdūzān; also known as Jīr Dezdān) is a village in Dastjerd Rural District, Alamut-e Gharbi District, Qazvin County, Qazvin Province, Iran. At the 2006 census, its population was 53, in 10 families.

References 

Populated places in Qazvin County